The Deanery of Lafford is an historic deanery in the Anglican Diocese of Lincoln in England. Located around the market town of Sleaford, it covers an area of c.200 square miles and serves a population of c.36,000.

In 1910 the Deanery was divided into the Deaneries of Lafford i or North Lafford, and the Deanery of Lafford ii or South Lafford. The two Deaneries re-merged in 1964 to form Lafford Deanery.

Parishes of the Gilbertine Benefice were added in 2010.

Rural Deans of Lafford 

 1978-1987: Thomas George Williamson
 1987-1996: John Stephen Thorold
 1996-2002: Canon Samuel Hall Speers
 2002-2003: Graham Parry Williams
 2003-2007: Peter John Mander
 2008-2012: John Andrew Patrick
 2012-present: Christine Pennock

Parish churches

The following ecclesiastical parish churches were part of Lafford Deanery .
Note: The parish churches marked † were not part of the deanery as it was constituted in the nineteenth century.
 Anwick, St Edith
 Asgarby, St Andrew
 Aslackby, St James
 Aswarby, St Denys
 Aunsby, St Thomas Of Canterbury
 Billingborough, St Andrew †
 Billinghay, St Michael And All Angels
 Bloxholm, St Mary
 Burton Pedwardine, St Andrew/Blessed Virgin Mary/St Nicholas
 Cranwell, St Andrew
 Dembleby, St Lucia
 Digby, St Thomas Of Canterbury
 Dorrington, St James
 Dowsby, St Andrew †
 Evedon, St Mary
 Ewerby, St Andrew
 Folkingham, St Andrew
 Great & Little Hale, St John The Baptist
 Heckington, St Andrew
 Helpringham, St Andrew
 Horbling, St Andrew †
 Kirkby Green, Holy Cross †
 Kirkby Laythorpe, St Denys
 Leasingham, St Andrew
 Martin, Holy Trinity†
 New Sleaford, St Denys
 Newton, St Botolph
 North Kyme, St Luke †
 Osbournby, St Peter & St Paul
 Pickworth, St Andrew
 Quarrington and Old Sleaford, St Botolph
 Rowston, St Clement
 Ruskington, All Saints
 Scopwick, Holy Cross
 Scot Willoughby, St Andrew
 Scredington, St Andrew
 Pointon, Christchurch
 Silk Willoughby, St Denys
 South Kyme, St Mary & All Saints
 Swarby, St Mary And All Saints
 Swaton, St Michael
 Threekingham, St Peter
 Timberland, St Andrew †
 Walcot, St Nicholas
 Walcott, St Oswald †

References

External links

Diocese of Lincoln website

Diocese of Lincoln
Deaneries of the Church of England